Prayag is a historical name of the area near the confluence of the Ganges and Yamuna rivers in the modern-day city of Allahabad in northern India. 

It may also refer to:

Places

Localities in Allahabad 
 a locality in the city of Allahabad; the city has been officially called Prayagraj since 2019
 Triveni Sangam, the confluence of rivers in Allahabad, considered sacred in Hinduism
 Prayag Junction, the main railway station in Allahabad

Other places 
 Panch Prayag, the five river confluences in northern India considered sacred in Hinduism:
 Vishnuprayag, also spelled Vishnu Prayag, a town at the confluence of the Alaknanda and the Dhauliganga
 Nandaprayag, also spelled Nand(a) Prayag, a town at the confluence of the Alaknanda and the Nandakini
 Karnaprayag, also spelled Karna Prayag, a town at the confluence of the Alaknanda and the Pindar
 Rudraprayag, also spelled Rudra Prayag, a town at the confluence of the Alaknanda and the Mandakini
 Devprayag, also spelled Dev(a) Prayag, a town at the confluence of the Alaknanda and Bhagirathi
 Prayag Film City, film studios in West Bengal, India

People 
 Prayag Bhati (b. 1991), Indian cricketer
 Prayag Jha (b. 1945), Indian artist specialising in etching

Other uses 

Prayag India, an Indian sanitaryware manufacturer
United Sports Club, a football club in Calcutta, India, formerly called Prayag United

See also 
 Prayag Kumbh Mela, a Hindu festival held in Allahabad
 Prayag Sangeet Samiti, a music institute in Allahabad
Prayagpur, a town in West Bengal, India